Harry Herman "Butch" O'Donnell (April 2, 1894 – January 31, 1958) was a Major League Baseball catcher who played for the Philadelphia Phillies in .

External links 

1918 births
1990 deaths
Baseball players from Pennsylvania
Buffalo Bisons (minor league) players
Chicago White Sox scouts
Cleveland Indians scouts
Major League Baseball catchers
Philadelphia Phillies players
Philadelphia Athletics scouts
Portland Duffs players
Richmond Climbers players
Rochester Red Wings players
Springfield Green Sox players